Followers is a Japanese J-Drama streaming television series and the first drama series by the director Mika Ninagawa. The series premiered on Netflix on February 27, 2020.

Plot 

The series revolves around the pulsating capital of Tokyo with all its life, colors, fashion and ambition as well as the fascinating lifestyle of the women living there. Limi Nara is a famous and successful fashion photographer who has advanced her career with photographs of modern Tokyo, capturing the changes in the city and its people. She leads a confident and independent life both privately and professionally. In contrast to her is the young actress Natsume Hyakuta, who is constantly having problems in her private and professional life in search of self-confidence and her own identity.

But that changes suddenly one day when Limi publishes a photograph of Natsume on Instagram. Natsume's life and that of those around her collide in blooming Tokyo as they try to defend their standing and status while following their hearts, dreams and social networks. All of these women are trying to find their own way to happiness and love.

Cast and characters 

Miki Nakatani as Limi Nara 
Elaiza Ikeda as Natsume Hyakuta 
Mari Natsuki as Eriko 
Yuka Itaya as Akane
KOM_I as Sunny 
Mika Nakashima as Sayo
Tadanobu Asano as Tamio Mochizuki
Shuhei Uesugi as Hiraku 
Nobuaki Kaneko as Yuruco
Hidekazu Mashima
Sho Kasamatsu
Yutaro as Nori
Christopher McCombs as Michael
Rola as herself
Daoko as herself
Miyavi as himself

Episodes

References

External links 
 
 

Japanese-language Netflix original programming
2020 Japanese television series debuts
Japanese-language television shows
Television shows set in Japan
Japanese drama television series
Television series about social media